Clymenia laevigata is a species of extinct cephalopods in the ammonoid order Clymeniida.

Distribution
Fossils of this species have been found in the Devonian of Australia, United Kingdom, Poland and Morocco.

References
Biolib
John Phillips Figures and descriptions of the Palaeozoic fossils of Cornwall, Devon, and West Somerset
Encyclopedia of Life

Late Devonian ammonites
Clymeniina